The United States produced 5.2 billion metric tons of carbon dioxide equivalent greenhouse gas (GHG) emissions in 2020, the second largest in the world after greenhouse gas emissions by China and among the countries with the highest greenhouse gas emissions per person. In 2019 China is estimated to have emitted 27% of world GHG, followed by the United States with 11%, then India with 6.6%. In total the United States has emitted a quarter of world GHG, more than any other country. Annual emissions are over 15 tons per person and, amongst the top eight emitters, is the highest country by greenhouse gas emissions per person.  However, the IEA estimates that the richest decile in the US emits over 55 tonnes of CO2 per capita each year. Because coal-fired power stations are gradually shutting down, in the 2010s emissions from electricity generation fell to second place behind transportation which is now the largest single source.  In 2020, 27% of the GHG emissions of the United States were from transportation, 25% from electricity, 24% from industry, 13% from commercial and residential buildings and 11% from agriculture. These greenhouse gas emissions are contributing to climate change in the United States, as well as worldwide.

Background

Types of greenhouse gases 

Greenhouse gases are gases; including carbon dioxide, nitrous oxide, ozone, methane, fluorinated gases and others; that absorb and emit radiant energy in the atmosphere. Atmospheric concentrations of greenhouse gases have increased significantly since the Industrial Revolution, due to human activities. The main greenhouse gases are carbon dioxide, methane, nitrous oxide, and fluorinated gases. Human powered force and activity is known as anthropogenic activity, which is causing a lot of detrimental effects on the planet. Such effects include erratic weather patterns, droughts and heat waves, wildfires, ocean acidification, sea level rise, glacial melting, increased average global temperatures, extinction, and many more.

Greenhouse gases have a range in how long they remain in the atmosphere. Regardless of where it was emitted from, emissions are roughly spread across the world and become mixed into a heterogeneous mixture. They are calculated in parts per million (ppm), parts per billion (ppb), and parts per trillion (ppt). In 2019, data states that there was 409.8 parts per million of carbon dioxide in the atmosphere. This strongly impacts the atmosphere in that it causes global warming, creating a thick blanket over the Earth's atmosphere.

Sources of greenhouse gases 
Carbon dioxide enters the atmosphere through the mass burning of fossil fuels such as coal, natural gas, and oil along with trees, solid waste, and biological materials. In 2018, carbon dioxide was estimated to approximately be 81% of all USA greenhouse gases emitted in 2018. Natural sinks and reservoirs absorb carbon dioxide emissions through a process called the carbon cycle. Sinks and reservoirs can include the ocean, forests and vegetation, and the ground. 

Methane is mainly produced by livestock and agricultural practices. Methane was estimated to make up 10% of emitted greenhouse gases. From the decrease in non-agricultural GHG emissions during COVID-19, the percent of the USA's GHG emissions from livestock increased from 2.6% to about 5%, which is a smaller percentage than many other countries likely because the USA has more greenhouse gas emissions from vehicles, machines, and factories. Nitrous oxide is a greenhouse gas produced mainly by agriculture. Fluorinated gases are synthetically produced and used as substitutes for stratospheric ozone-depleting substances.

Greenhouse gases are produced from a wide variety of human activities, though some of the greatest impacts come from burning fossil fuels, deforestation, agriculture and industrial manufacturing. In the United States, power generation was the largest source of emissions for many years, but in 2017, the transportation sector overtook it as the leading emissions source. As of that year, the breakdown was transportation at 29%, followed by electricity generation at 28% and industry at 22%.

After carbon dioxide, the next most abundant compound is methane, though there have been methodological differences in how to measure its effects. According to a 2016 study, US methane emissions were underestimated by the EPA for at least a decade, by some 30 to 50 percent. Currently, the US government is working to reduce methane emissions in the agriculture, mining, landfill, and petroleum industries.

Another area of concern is that of ozone-depleting substances such as chlorofluorocarbons (CFCs) and hydrofluorocarbons (HFCs), which are often potent greenhouse gases with serious global warming potential (GWP). However, significant progress has been made in reducing the usage of these gases as a result of the Montreal Protocol, the international treaty that took effect in 1989.

Major emissions-creating events 
In February 2018, an explosion and blowout in a natural gas well in Belmont County, Ohio was detected by the Copernicus Sentinel-5P satellite's Tropospheric Monitoring Instrument.  The well was owned by XTO Energy. About 30 homes were evacuated, and brine and produced water were discharged into streams flowing into the Ohio River. The blowout lasted 20 days, releasing more than 50,000 tons of methane into the atmosphere. The blowout leaked more methane than is discharged by most European nations in a year from their oil and gas industries.

Reporting requirement
Reporting of greenhouse gases was first implemented on a voluntary basis with the creation of a federal register of greenhouse gas emissions authorized under Section 1605(b) of the Energy Policy Act of 1992. This program provides a means for utilities, industries, and other entities to establish a public record of their emissions and the results of voluntary measures to reduce, avoid, or sequester GHG emission

In 2009, the United States Environmental Protection Agency established a similar program mandating reporting for facilities that produce 25,000 or more metric tons of carbon dioxide per year. This has resulted in thousands of US companies monitoring and reporting their greenhouse gas emissions, covering about half of all GHG emissions in the United States.

A separate inventory of fossil fuel  emissions is provided by Project Vulcan, a NASA/DOE funded effort to quantify North American fossil fuel emissions over time.

Mitigation

Federal Policies 
The United States government has held shifting attitudes toward addressing greenhouse gas emissions. The George W. Bush administration opted not to sign the Kyoto Protocol, but the Obama administration entered the Paris Agreement. The Trump administration withdrew from the Paris Agreement while increasing the export of crude oil and gas, making the United States the largest producer. In 2021, the Biden administration committed to reducing emissions to half of 2005 levels by 2030. In 2022, President Biden signed the Inflation Reduction Act into law, which is estimated to provide around $375 billion over 10 years to fight climate change.  the social cost of carbon is 51 dollars a tonne whereas academics say it should be more than 3 times higher.

Cross-sectoral
State and Local Climate and Energy Program
Federal Energy Management Program

Transportation

The transportation sector accounted for nearly 29% of GHG emissions in the United States in 2019, with 58% of emissions coming from light-duty vehicles. , states lack legislation for low emission zones. Programs to reduce greenhouse gas emissions from the transportation sector include:

 The Corporate Average Fuel Economy (CAFE) Program: Requires automobile manufacturers to meet average fuel economy standards for the light-duty vehicles, large passenger vans and SUVs sold in the United States. Fuel economy standards vary according to the size of the vehicle.

SmartWay: Helps improve environmental outcomes for companies in the freight industry.
Renewable Fuel Standard: Under the Energy Policy Act of 2005, United States Environmental Protection Agency is responsible for promulgating regulations to ensure that gasoline sold in the United States contains a specific volume of renewable fuel.

FreedomCAR and Fuel Partnership and Vehicle Technologies Program: The program works jointly with DOE's hydrogen, fuel cell, and infrastructure R&D efforts and the efforts to develop improved technology for hybrid electric vehicles, which include components (such as batteries and electric motors). The U.S. government uses six "criteria pollutants" as indicators of air quality: ozone, carbon monoxide, sulfur dioxide, nitrogen oxides, particulate matter, and lead and does not include carbon dioxide and other greenhouse gases.

Clean Cities: A network of local coalitions created by DOE in 1993 that works to support energy efficiency and clean fuel efforts in local transportation contexts.
Congestion Mitigation and Air Quality Improvement (CMAQ) Program: Provides funds to states to improve air quality and congestion through the implementation of surface transportation projects (e.g., traffic flow and public transit improvements).
Aviation industry regulation: Emissions from commercial and business jets make up 10% of U.S. transportation sector emissions and 3% of total national GHG emissions. In 2016, the EPA issued an "endangerment finding" that allowed the agency to regulate aircraft emissions, and the first proposed standards under that legal determination were issued in July 2020.
Developing alternative energy sources: The Department of Energy’s Bioenergy Technologies Office (BETO) supports research into biofuels as part of that agency's efforts to reduce transportation-related GHG emissions.
Diesel Emissions Reduction Act (DERA) Program: Provides grants for diesel emissions reduction projects and technologies.

Energy consumption, residential and commercial
As of 2020, buildings in the United States consume roughly 40% of the country's total electricity and contribute a similar percentage of GHG emissions.
 EPA and DOE Clean Energy Programs – Energy Star
Commercial Building Integration
Residential Building Integration
Weatherization Assistance Program
State Energy Program

Energy consumption, industrial
Energy Star for industry
 Industrial Technologies Program (ITP)

Energy supply 

 The Coalbed Methane Outreach Program (CMOP) works to reduce methane released into the atmosphere as a result of coal mining by supporting recovery of naturally occurring coal mine gases and encouraging the production of coalbed methane energy, among other uses.
 Natural Gas STAR Program
 The government also supports alternative energy sources that do not rely on fossil fuels, including wind power, solar power, geothermal power, and biofuel.
 These clean energy sources can often be integrated into the electric grid in what are known as distributed generation systems.
 EPA Clean Energy Programs - Green Power Partnership
 EPA Clean Energy Programs - Combined Heat and Power Partnership
 Carbon capture and storage Research Program
Advanced Energy Systems Program
CO2 Capture
CO2 Storage

Agriculture
 Environmental Quality Incentives Program
 Conservation Reserve Program
 Conservation Security Program
 AgSTAR Program

Forestry
 Healthy Forests Initiative
 Forest Land Enhancement Program

Waste management
 The Landfill Methane Outreach Program (LMOP) promotes the use of landfill gas, a naturally occurring byproduct of decaying landfill waste, as a sustainable energy source. Besides reducing emissions, landfill gas utilization has also been credited for reductions in air pollution, improvements to health and safety conditions, and economic benefits for local communities.
 In addition to reducing emissions from waste already in landfills, the EPA's WasteWise program works with businesses to encourage recycling and source reduction to keep waste out of landfills in the first place.

Regional initiatives

 Western Climate Initiative
 The Regional Greenhouse Gas Initiative (RGGI), founded in 2007, is a state-level emissions capping and trading program by nine northeastern U.S. states: Connecticut, Delaware, Maine, Maryland, Massachusetts, New Hampshire, New York, Rhode Island, Vermont, and Virginia. It is a cap and trade program in which states "sell nearly all emission allowances through auctions and invest proceeds in energy efficiency, renewable energy and other consumer benefit programs."
 Western Governors Association Clean and Diversified Energy Initiative
 Powering the Plains
 Carbon Sequestration Regional Partnerships
U.S. Mayors Climate Protection Agreement
 National Governors Association's (NGA) Securing a Clean Energy Future.

State Policies

California
Vehicle Air Pollution (Senate Resolution 27): States and implies that California does not have to adhere to cutbacks in federal emissions standards, thereby allowing stricter California emissions standards than the federal government. This Senate Resolution stems from the previous administration's efforts to reverse environmental policies, and in this case, vehicle emissions standards. California's authority to set its own emissions standards is allowed through California's Clean Air Act preemption waiver granted to the state by the EPA in 2009.  California's waiver applies to vehicles made in 2009 and later. The previous state standard included a goal for certain vehicles to reach an average 35 miles per gallon. California saw a large decline in vehicle emissions from 2007 to 2013 but a rise in emissions following 2013, which can be attributed to different circumstances, some of which include population and employment growth, and increases in overall state GDP indicating more economic activity in the state.
Cap-and-Trade Program: Market-based carbon pricing program that sets a statewide cap on emissions. This cap declines annually and applies to large emitters that account for over 80 percent of California's GHG emissions. The California Air Resources Board (CARB) creates an allowance for each ton of carbon dioxide emissions. The number of allowances decreases over time and incentivizes a flexible approach to emissions reduction through trading.
Advanced Clean Cars: Addresses GHG emissions and criteria air pollutants in California through the Low-Emission Vehicle (LEV) regulation and the Zero-Emission Vehicle (ZEV) regulation. The LEV regulation establishes increasing emissions standards for passenger vehicles through model year 2025. The ZEV regulation requires vehicle manufacturers to sell a certain percentage of ZEVs and plug-in hybrids annually through 2025. The next iteration of this program for future model years is under development. 15 states have adopted the regulations under this program. 
Advanced Clean Cars II: Mandates a ban on the sale of internal combustion engine passenger vehicles, trucks, and SUVs starting in 2035, and mandates annual increases in ZEV sales targets from model year 2026 to 2035. California has adopted the regulation and New York announced that it would follow. 
Advanced Clean Trucks: Requires manufacturers of medium-and heavy-duty trucks to sell an increasing percentage of zero-emission trucks each year starting with model year 2024. In addition to California, Oregon, Washington, New Jersey, New York, and Massachusetts have also adopted this regulation. 10 other states and the District of Columbia intend to adopt in the future.
Low Carbon Fuel Standard (LCFS): Establishes annual targets through 2030 to ensure transportation-related fuels become cleaner and less carbon intensive. Oregon has a similar program entitled, Clean Fuels Program, which runs until 2025.

GHG reduction targets 

 States with statutory GHG reduction targets: California, Colorado, Connecticut, Hawaii, Maryland, Maine, Minnesota, Massachusetts, New Jersey, New York, Nevada, Oregon, Rhode Island, Vermont, Virginia, and Washington.
 States that don't have statutory targets, but have statutory GHG reporting requirements: Iowa and Pennsylvania.

Renewable portfolio standards 

 38 states have established renewable portfolio standards or voluntary targets, which increase the share of renewable electricity generation over time.

Lead by example programs 
 New Hampshire's Better Buildings Neighborhood Program
 New Jersey's Clean Energy Program
 Atlanta's Virginia Highland - 1st Carbon Neutral Zone in the United States

Local programs

Municipal, county, and regional governments have substantial influence on greenhouse gas emissions, and many have reduction goals and programs. Local governments are often one of the largest employers in their jurisdictions, and can achieve substantial reductions in their own operations, such as by using zero-emissions vehicles, making government buildings energy-efficient, making or buying renewable energy, and providing incentives for employees to walk, bike, or take transit to work. Local governments have control over several policy areas which influence emissions for the population as a whole. These include land use regulations such as zoning; transportation infrastructure like public transit, parking, and bike lanes; and building codes and efficiency regulations. Some municipalities act as utility cooperatives and set a minimum standard for renewable generation.

Non-governmental responses

Individual action 

Actions taken by individuals on climate change include diet, travel alternatives, household energy use, reduced consumption and family size. Individuals can also engage in local and political advocacy around issues of climate change. Individuals have a variety of carbon offsetting options available to mitigate their environmental impact through non-profit organizations.

Business community 

Numerous large businesses have started cutting emissions and committed to eliminate net emissions by various dates in the future, resulting in higher demand for renewable energy and lower demand for fossil fuel energy. Businesses may also go carbon neutral by enrolling in Carbonfree® Programs or certifying their products as Carbonfree® through carbon offset organizations.

Technologies in development
 Carbon Sequestration Regional Partnerships
 Nuclear:
Generation IV Nuclear Energy Systems Initiative
 Nuclear Hydrogen Initiative
 Advanced Fuel Cycle Initiative
 Global Nuclear Energy Partnership
 Clean Automotive Technology
 Hydrogen Technology
 High-temperature superconductivity

See also

Climate Registry
Coal in the United States
Energy conservation in the United States
Greenhouse gas emissions in Kentucky
List of U.S. states by carbon dioxide emissions
Phase-out of fossil fuel vehicles
Plug-in electric vehicles in the United States
Politics of global warming
Regulation of Greenhouse Gases Under the Clean Air Act
Select Committee on Energy Independence and Global Warming
U.S. Climate Change Science Program
List of coal-fired power stations in the United States
List of natural gas-fired power stations in the United States

References

External links

 Inventory by Climate Trace
 Live carbon emissions from electricity generation in some states
 U.S. Emissions Data (Energy Information Administration).

 
Transportation in the United States
Energy in the United States